Laura Trott  (born 7 December 1984) is a British Conservative Party politician, who was elected as the Member of Parliament (MP) for Sevenoaks at the 2019 general election. She has been serving as Parliamentary Under-Secretary of State at the Department for Work and Pensions since October 2022. She is the first woman to represent the constituency. Before her parliamentary career, Trott worked as a partner at Portland Communications, and as a special adviser.

Early life and career
Trott grew up in Oxted, Surrey, England. She attended Oxted School and then studied history and economics at Pembroke College, Oxford. She then became a strategy consultant at Booz & Company. Trott is an ambassador for the Sutton Trust, an educational charity.

Political career
Trott was a Conservative Party councillor for Frognal and Fitzjohns on the Camden London Borough Council between 2010 and 2014.

In January 2009, she became a political adviser for the Conservatives. Trott then became a special adviser to then Minister for the Cabinet Office Francis Maude in May 2010 with the remit of political policy and media, and was later promoted to chief of staff. She was subsequently appointed as a political adviser in the Number 10 Policy Unit, responsible for education and family policy under then Prime Minister David Cameron. Trott was credited for formulating the party's tax-free childcare policy. After the 2015 general election, Trott was promoted to director of strategic communication. In 2016, she was appointed a Member of the Order of the British Empire (MBE) in Cameron's Resignation Honours for her political and public service. After the election of Prime Minister Theresa May, she left the government and became a partner at the political consultancy and public relations firm Portland Communications in September 2017.

Trott was selected as the Conservative candidate for Sevenoaks in Kent on 10 November 2019. It is a notionally safe Conservative seat, having elected a member of the party since 1924, and was previously represented by former Secretary of State for Defence Michael Fallon. She was elected as MP for Sevenoaks in the 2019 general election with a majority of 20,818 (40.9%). Trott is the first woman to represent the constituency. Trott was a policy fellow at the Centre for Science and Policy at the University of Cambridge between 2020 and 2021.

In the private member's bill ballot, she was the highest placed Conservative MP which guaranteed that her bill would be debated in parliament. She presented her bill on 5 February 2020, which aimed to restrict access to botulinum toxin and filler cosmetic procedures for under 18s. It became law in October 2021.

Trott has been a member of the Health and Social Care Select Committee since March 2020. She is also on the steering committee of the China Research Group. Trott co-wrote a policy paper advocating for the establishment of "accelerator zones" with fellow Conservative MP Bim Afolami in February 2021 for the think tank Social Market Foundation. The zones would have relaxation of visa rules, tax incentives, and policy fellowship programmes.

On 6 July 2022, in the wake of the resignations of Chancellor Rishi Sunak and Health Secretary Sajid Javid from the second Johnson ministry following the Chris Pincher scandal, Trott resigned as Parliamentary Private Secretary to the Department for Transport, citing "trust in politics is – and must always be – of the utmost importance, but sadly in recent months this has been lost". Two days later, following Johnson's resignation as Conservative Party leader, she endorsed Sunak's bid to succeed him in the July–September 2022 Conservative Party leadership election.

Personal life
Trott is married to Bahador 'Bids' Mahvelati, a partner at professional services firm PriceWaterhouseCoopers. They have one daughter and twin sons.

References

External links

1984 births
Living people
Alumni of Pembroke College, Oxford
Conservative Party (UK) MPs for English constituencies
Female members of the Parliament of the United Kingdom for English constituencies
UK MPs 2019–present
21st-century British women politicians
Conservative Party (UK) councillors
Councillors in the London Borough of Camden
Members of the Order of the British Empire
People from Oxted
People from Sevenoaks
21st-century English women
21st-century English people
Women councillors in England